Stowaway, alternatively known as Snakeheads, is a 2001 Hong Kong action film based on the true story of a group of stowaways from Fuzhou illegally immigrating to the United Kingdom in 2000. In the incident, 58 illegal immigrants suffocated to death in an airtight truck of tomatoes at Dover, England on 20 June 2000.

Synopsis
In June 2000, a group of Fuzhou people spend a fortune for various reasons to be smuggled to the United Kingdom. They are first sent to Quailin, before crossing the border to Vietnam. After waiting there for fake documents for flying to Moscow, they head to the Netherlands. They are unable to travel to Moscow as the people smugglers are detected. The plan is changed and all the illegal immigrants have to travel to Ukraine by car, then walk across the border to the Czech Republic through snowstorms. They are able to sneak into the Netherlands and hide in a truck to enter into the United Kingdom, but the airtight space in the truck results in the deaths of 58 people, leaving only 2 survivors.

Cast
 Julian Cheung as Chow Tai-Fuk
 Athena Chu as Kam Lan
 Hu Bing as Chi-Ming
 Chang Chia-chia as Ming-Wai
 Benny Lai as Vincent
 Oscar Leung as
 Michael Chow as Yiu-Chung
 Jady Lee as Siu-Tsui
 Annie Wu as Si-Nga
 Mou Feilian as Kuen Jie
 Chan Jun Kin as Hang Jai

Production
Filming locations took place in Fuzhou, Vietnam, Moscow, Ukraine, and England.

References

External links
 
 

2001 films
Hong Kong action films
2000s Cantonese-language films
Films directed by Clarence Fok
2000s Hong Kong films